The 2001 Big League World Series youth baseball tournament took place from August 4–11 in Easley, South Carolina, U.S. Westminster, California, U.S., defeated Valencia, Venezuela, in the championship game.

This was the first BLWS held in Easley.

Teams

Results

United States Pool

International Pool

Consolation round

Elimination Round

References

Big League World Series
Big League World Series